Royston Trocard (born 17 September 1967) is a Dominican-born former cricketer who played for Sint Maarten.  Trocard was a right-handed batsman who fielded as a wicket-keeper.

Trocard played two Twenty20 matches for Sint Maarten.  The first of these came against the United States Virgin Islands in the 2006 Stanford 20/20 at the Stanford Cricket Ground.  Trocard made two stumpings in this match, while with the bat he scored 17 runs before being run out by Clifford Walwyn.  The United States Virgin Islands won the match by 47 runs.  His second Twenty20 appearance came against Saint Vincent and the Grenadines in the 2008 Stanford 20/20.  He took a single catch in this match, while with the bat he scored 27 runs before he was dismissed by Orlanzo Jackson.  St Vincent and the Grenadines won the match by 10 runs.

References

External links
Royston Trocard at ESPNcricinfo
Royston Trocard at CricketArchive

1967 births
Living people
Dominica cricketers
Sint Maarten cricketers
Dominica emigrants to Sint Maarten
Wicket-keepers